Extravagance may refer to:

 Extravagance (1916 film), an American film
 Extravagance (1919 film), an American lost film
 Extravagance (1921 film), an American silent film directed by Phil Rosen
 Extravagance (1930 film), a 1930 American romantic drama directed by Phil Rosen

See also
 Tryphé, extravagance in Roman antiquity
 "Extravagant", a song by Lil Durk